Trombidium daunium is a species of mite in the genus Trombidium in the family Trombidiidae. It is found in Italy.

References
 Synopsis of the described Arachnida of the World: Trombidiidae

Trombidiidae
Animals described in 1937
Arachnids of Europe